Manavazian was a region and a family of the old Armenia c. 300–800, in the region of Manazkert.

See also
List of regions of old Armenia

Armenian noble families
Early medieval Armenian regions